Martha Catherine Kearney (born 8 October 1957) is a British-Irish journalist and broadcaster. She was the main presenter of BBC Radio 4's lunchtime news programme The World at One for 11 years, and in April 2018 became a presenter of the early morning Today programme.

Early life
Kearney was born in Dublin, and brought up in an academic environment; her father, the historian Hugh Kearney, taught first at Sussex and later at Edinburgh universities. She was educated at St Joseph's (later St Wilfrid's) Catholic School, Burgess Hill, Sussex, during her primary-school years, briefly attended Brighton and Hove High School and then completed her secondary education at George Watson's Ladies College in Edinburgh. From 1976 to 1980 she read classics at St Anne's College, Oxford. In her final year at Oxford, she worked as a volunteer in hospital radio.

Career
Kearney began her career as a phone operator on phone-in programmes at the London commercial radio station LBC and Independent Radio News in London. She was a reporter on the AM programme before becoming a political correspondent when she covered the 1987 general election. In 1988 she joined A Week in Politics on Channel 4 as a reporter. In 1990 she moved to the BBC's political programme On the Record.

BBC
In 1998, Kearney became a regular presenter of BBC Radio 4's Woman's Hour. In 2000 she became political editor of BBC Two's Newsnight programme. She presented Newsnight and its weekly consumer survey of entertainment and culture, Newsnight Review, with increasing frequency. She was a candidate to succeed Andrew Marr as the BBC's political editor in 2005, but lost out to Nick Robinson.

Kearney featured in a spoof segment of the BBC comedy series Time Trumpet, titled "Honey, I Shrunk Martha Kearney", in which Jeremy Paxman, in a fantasy version of Newsnight, interviewed her when she was a third of her normal size. She also featured later in the episode in a spoof report from Notting Hill. In 2006, she presented with her father a Radio 4 series on the history of universities in Britain, The Idea of a University.

Kearney presented her final Woman's Hour on 19 March 2007 and her final Newsnight on 23 March 2007. She became the main presenter of Radio 4's lunchtime news programme The World at One on 16 April 2007. She presented Newsnight Review which became The Review Show from 2006 until 2014.

Kearney was nominated for a BAFTA award for her coverage of the Northern Ireland peace process in 1998. She was, with Jenni Murray, 2004 TRIC radio presenter of the year, and won a Sony bronze award for a programme on child poverty. She was awarded Political Commentator of the Year by The House magazine in 2006. In 2014 the Voice of the Listener & Viewer awarded her its Best Individual Contribution to Radio award.

In 2013, Kearney won her episode of the Great Comic Relief Bake Off competing against Claudia Winkleman, Ed Byrne and Helen Glover.

Kearney joined Today on Radio 4 in April 2018 as a main presenter, swapping posts with Sarah Montague.

Other BBC work includes The Secret World of Lewis Carroll (2015) for BBC Two, Being The Brontes (2016) for BBC Two, The Great Butterfly Adventure (2016) for BBC Four, The Books That Made Britain (2016) for BBC One, Great Irish Journeys (2017) for BBC Four, and MAKE! Craft Britain (2017) for BBC Four.

She has also presented Talking Books for the BBC from Hay Festival interviewing Kazuo Ishiguro and Marlon James amongst others.

Other activities
In 2004 Kearney was a judge for the Baillie Gifford Prize for Non-Fiction (formerly the Samuel Johnson Prize for non-fiction). She chaired the Prize's judging panel in 2020.

In 2005 she chaired the judges for the women-only Orange Prize for Fiction.

Kearney chaired the judges for the 2012 Hippocrates Prize for Poetry and Medicine.

In 2013 Kearney was a judge for the Man Booker Prize.

Kearney was President of the Classical Association, 2013–14.

Kearney's husband was an executive producer of the Academy Awards nominated short documentary Watani: My Homeland. In the run-up to the ceremony Kearney described her preparations for the "red carpet" with Eddie Mair on the Radio 4 PM programme.

Kearney is a keen bee-keeper and has made the BBC programmes Who Killed The Honey Bee (2009) for BBC Four, The Wonder of Bees (2014) for BBC Four and a two-part nature documentary Hive Alive (2014) alongside Chris Packham for BBC Two.

In 2023, it was announced that Kearney joined Camphill Milton Keynes Communities as their patron.  The charity was home to her brother-in-law for more than 30-years and she is supporting them to launch their £15m capital campaign.

References

External links
 
 BBC profile 
 "Media: CV" interview, The Independent, 6 April 1998
 15 February 2007 Independent article
 19 May 2006 Guardian article
 Who Killed the honey bee BBC documentary

1957 births
Living people
Alumni of St Anne's College, Oxford
BBC newsreaders and journalists
BBC Radio 4 presenters
Irish radio presenters
Irish women radio presenters
British women radio presenters
People educated at Brighton and Hove High School
People educated at George Watson's College
Mass media people from Dublin (city)
Irish people of English descent
People from Sussex
English radio presenters
English journalists
Irish journalists
Irish women journalists
Woman's Hour
Presidents of the Classical Association